Fuss (German for foot) refer to:

 4778 Fuss, a main-belt asteroid
 Fuss (surname), a surname
 Fuss Pot, a fictional character

See also

 Fuss Peak
 Tadeusz Fuss-Kaden